Reputation is generalized or held view of a person or a group

Reputation may also refer to:

Film
 Reputation (1917 film), a silent film produced by Frank Powell
 Reputation (1921 film), a silent film produced by Irving Thalberg

Music
 Reputation (album), a 2017 album by Taylor Swift
 "Reputation", a song by Post Malone from Twelve Carat Toothache
 Reputation (Dusty Springfield album), 1990
 The Reputation, a defunct indie rock band from Chicago, Illinois
 The Reputation (album), a 2002 album by The Reputation

See also
 Reputation management is the practice of understanding or influencing an individual or business' reputation
 Bad Reputation (disambiguation)